The Stadium Conglomerate is a geologic formation in San Diego County, California.  It is found at the northern end of Mission Valley near San Diego Stadium.

Geology 
The formation consists of a massive cobble conglomerate with a dark yellowish-brown coarse-grained sandstone matrix. The conglomerate has dispersed lenses of fossiliferous crossbedded sandstone.

It overlies the Friars Formation, and underlies the sandstone Mission Valley Formation.

Fossil content 
It preserves fossils dating back to the Eocene epoch of the Paleogene period, during the Cenozoic Era.  The fossils include calcareous nanoplankton.

See also 

 
 
 List of fossiliferous stratigraphic units in California
 Paleontology in California

References

Further reading 
 

Geologic formations of California
Paleogene stratigraphic units of North America
Paleogene California
Eocene Series of North America
Conglomerate formations
Geology of San Diego County, California
Geography of San Diego
Mission Valley, San Diego
Paleontology in California